BRCA1 C Terminus (BRCT) domain  is a family of evolutionarily related proteins. It is named after the C-terminal domain of BRCA1, a DNA-repair protein that serves as a marker of breast cancer susceptibility.

The BRCT domain is found predominantly in proteins involved in cell cycle checkpoint functions responsive to DNA damage, for example as found in the breast cancer DNA-repair protein BRCA1. The domain is an approximately 100 amino acid tandem repeat, which appears to act as a phospho-protein binding domain.

Examples 

Human proteins containing this domain include:

 BARD1; BRCA1
 CTDP1; TDT or DNTT
 ECT2
 LIG4
 MCPH1; MDC1
 NBN
 PARP1; PARP4; PAXIP1; PES1
 REV1; RFC1; TOPBP1; TP53BP1; XRCC1

References

External links
 
 
 

Protein domains